Guernsey Post is the postal service for the island of Guernsey, Channel Islands. It includes a Philatelic bureau, and regularly issues both definitive and commemorative stamps. It also provides postal services for Sark.

In contrast to the United Kingdom, Guernsey Post pillar boxes can be identified by their distinctive blue colour.

History

The first pillar boxes in Britain were introduced in the Channel Islands as an experiment in 1852.  Anthony Trollope, the novelist, who was employed by the General Post Office, trialled pillar boxes in the Channel Islands before introducing them into mainland Britain. He was influenced by roadside letter-receiving pillars used in France. Before the use of pillar boxes, on the mainland, individual letters would be taken by hand to a letter receiving house or post office, which was often a coaching inn, a postage stamp purchased and the letter handed to the receiver or postmaster, to connect with the mail coach and later the railway. In the Channel Islands, people took their letters to the mail steamer when it was awaiting the tide in the harbour – the particular problem of an island mail service then. Pillar boxes allowed letters to be posted at any time and they could then be collected when a steamer was due. They were convenient and immediately successful. However, as with many innovations, the first boxes were introduced into Jersey. One of these original pillar boxes can be seen in Union Street, St Peter Port and has been maintained by Guernsey Post in its traditional red livery.

Guernsey stamps were first issued in the island during the German Occupation of 1940–1945, when there was a great shortage of British stamps, as all ties with mainland Britain had been severed by the German authorities.

Guernsey's government, the States of Guernsey, took over the running of postal services from the British Government in October 1969 (as did Jersey, forming Jersey Post). Since then on it has regularly issued Guernsey stamps. Guernsey is postcoded as the GY postcode area, established in 1993 as an extension of the United Kingdom postcode system.

In 2001, the States of Guernsey commercialised the Post Office, and it became Guernsey Post Ltd and was awarded the licence to operate the reserved sector postal operation and meet the Universal Service Obligation (USO). To monitor Guernsey Post and either encourage competition in the market or where it is missing provide a controlling force the Office of Utility Regulation, otherwise known as the OUR, was created.

Guernsey Post is a member of the Small European Postal Administration Cooperation.

Postage stamps of Guernsey 

Guernsey and Alderney Stamps are world-renowned for their beauty and quality. The first Guernsey Postage Stamps were designed and printed during the occupation in 1941 when supplies of British stamps ran out. Over the years many aspects of island life have been commemorated and depicted on Guernsey and Alderney stamps. Topics of past philatelic issues include the sea, the natural world, agriculture and horticulture, transport, sport, Christmas, military, art and entertainment. Guernsey Stamps are produced by Guernsey Post.

References

External links
Guernsey Philatelic Bureau website
Guernsey Post Ltd website
Office of Utility regulation website
Swift – Postal Automation System

Communications in Guernsey
Postal organizations
Postal system of the United Kingdom
Members of the Small European Postal Administration Cooperation